was a village located in Minamisaku District, Nagano Prefecture, Japan.

On March 20, 2005, Yachiho, along with the town of Saku (also from Minamisaku District), was merged to create the town of Sakuho.

Dissolved municipalities of Nagano Prefecture
Sakuho, Nagano